Chrouy Sdau is a khum (commune) of Thma Koul District in Battambang Province in north-western Cambodia.

Villages
Chrouy Sday contains three villages.

References

Communes of Battambang province
Thma Koul District